Asemonea pinangensis is a jumping spider species in the genus Asemonea.

Description
The spider is small and resembles both Asemonea maculata and Asemonea tanikawai. The male has been identified and typically measures  in length. It has a whiteish yellow carapace with a black pattern and a black abdomen with a light pattern.

Distribution
Asemonea pinangensis is found in Malaysia.

References

Arthropods of Malaysia
Salticidae
Spiders described in 1980
Spiders of Asia